Billy Ray Locklin (September 13, 1936 – November 8, 2019) was an American football defensive lineman who played ten seasons in the Canadian Football League for two different teams. He was a CFL All Star three times.

Locklin started his pro career with the American Football League's Oakland Raiders. He played college football at New Mexico State University.

References

1936 births
2019 deaths
American players of Canadian football
Canadian football defensive linemen
Hamilton Tiger-Cats players
Montreal Alouettes players
New Mexico State Aggies football players
Oakland Raiders players
People from Rockdale, Texas
American Football League players